Pomins is an unincorporated community in El Dorado County, California.

A post office operated at Pomins from 1915 to 1942. The name honors its first postmaster, Frank J. Pomin.

References

Unincorporated communities in California
Unincorporated communities in El Dorado County, California